Poropuntius chondrorhynchus is a species of ray-finned fish in the genus Poropuntius from the Mekong, Salween, Maeklong and Chao Phraya basins in south-east Asia. Poropuntius chondrorhynchus may be a junior synonym of Poropuntius laoensis.

References 

chondrorhynchus
Fish described in 1934